In the United States Government, the Bureau of European and Eurasian Affairs (EUR) is part of the United States Department of State, charged with implementing U.S. foreign policy and promoting U.S. interests in Europe and Eurasia (which it defines as being Europe, Turkey, Cyprus, the Caucasus Region, and Russia), as well as advising the Under Secretary of State for Political Affairs. It is headed by the Assistant Secretary of State for European and Eurasian Affairs.

From 1949 to 1983, European affairs were within the purview of the Bureau of European Affairs.

Organization
The offices of the Bureau of European and Eurasian Affairs direct, coordinate, and supervise U.S. government activities within the region, including political, economic, consular, public diplomacy, and administrative management issues.

 Front Office
 Joint Executive Office – Oversees the bureau's human resources; shared with the Bureau of International Organization Affairs
 Office of the Coordinator for U.S. Assistance to Europe and Eurasia – Coordinates policy regarding the European Union, the European Commission, the European Council, the European Parliament, and the Council of Europe
 Office of the Special Envoy for Holocaust Issues
 Office of European Union and Regional Affairs
 Office of Caucasus Affairs and Regional Conflicts – Responsible for Armenia, Azerbaijan, and Georgia, and supports the U.S. Co-Chair of the OSCE Minsk Group
 Office of Central European Affairs – Responsible for Austria, Bulgaria, the Czech Republic, Hungary, Liechtenstein, Poland, Romania, Slovakia, Slovenia, and Switzerland
 Office of Nordic and Baltic Affairs – Responsible for Denmark, Estonia, Finland, Iceland, Latvia, Lithuania, Norway, and Sweden
 Office of Policy and Global Issues – Responsible for policy formulation and substantive expertise about global issues within the EUR region; strategic planning; and Congressional relations
 Office of Press and Policy Outreach – Coordinates media engagement and public outreach, and prepares press guidance for the Department Spokesperson in the Bureau of Public Affairs
 Office of Public Diplomacy – Coordinates public diplomacy strategies at U.S. posts in the EUR region
 Office of Policy and Regional Affairs – Coordinates policy on nonproliferation and security issues, nuclear and strategic issues, missile defense, arms control, security assistance, sanctions, Cooperative Threat Reduction (CTR) policy and implementation, and international space cooperation
 Office of Regional Security and Political Military Affairs – Coordinates policy on U.S. security interests, as well as policy regarding NATO, the Organization for Security and Co-operation in Europe, and European contributions to multinational military operations
 Office of Russian Affairs – Responsible for Russia. Formerly the Office of Soviet Union Affairs - Responsible for the Soviet Union
 Office of South Central European Affairs – Responsible for Albania, Bosnia-Herzegovina, Croatia, Kosovo, Montenegro, North Macedonia and Serbia
 Office of Southern European Affairs – Responsible for Cyprus, Greece, and Turkey
 Office of Eastern European Affairs – Responsible for Belarus, Moldova, and Ukraine
 Office of Western European Affairs – Responsible for Andorra, Belgium, France, Germany, the Holy See/Vatican City, Ireland, Italy, Luxembourg, Malta, Monaco, the Netherlands, Portugal, San Marino, Spain and the United Kingdom

References

External links

EUR
United States diplomacy
United States and NATO
Government agencies established in 1983
United States–European Union relations
United States–European relations
Albania–United States relations
Andorra–United States relations
Armenia–United States relations
Austria–United States relations
Azerbaijan–United States relations
Belarus–United States relations
Belgium–United States relations
Bosnia and Herzegovina–United States relations
Bulgaria–United States relations
Croatia–United States relations
Cyprus–United States relations
Czech Republic–United States relations
Denmark–United States relations
Estonia–United States relations
France–United States relations
Finland–United States relations
Georgia (country)–United States relations
Greece–United States relations
Germany–United States relations
Holy See–United States relations
Hungary–United States relations
Iceland–United States relations
Ireland–United States relations
Italy–United States relations
Kosovo–United States relations
Latvia–United States relations
Liechtenstein–United States relations
Lithuania–United States relations
Luxembourg–United States relations
Malta–United States relations
Moldova–United States relations
Monaco–United States relations
Montenegro–United States relations
Netherlands–United States relations
North Macedonia–United States relations
Norway–United States relations
Poland–United States relations
Portugal–United States relations
Romania–United States relations
Russia–United States relations
San Marino–United States relations
Serbia–United States relations
Slovakia–United States relations
Slovenia–United States relations
Soviet Union–United States relations
Spain–United States relations
Sweden–United States relations
Switzerland–United States relations
Turkey–United States relations
Ukraine–United States relations
United Kingdom–United States relations